Azizabad-e Bonavaj (also Romanized as ‘Azīzābād-e Bonāvaj; also known as ‘Azīzābād-e Lūsheh, Benāvch-e Lūsheh, Sheyān, and Shīān) is a village in Zamkan Rural District, in the Central District of Salas-e Babajani County, Kermanshah Province, Iran. At the 2006 census, its population was 136, in 29 families.

References 

Populated places in Salas-e Babajani County